"Stubborn Love" is a song by American folk rock band the Lumineers. It was released in 2012 as the second single from their debut self-titled studio album.

Music video
There are 2 music videos for "Stubborn Love". The first one released on October 3, 2012 is a collection of live performances and behind the scenes footage shot between April and August 2012 during the Lumineers Big Parade 2012 tour. The 2nd one released on February 7, 2013 centers around a young daughter who is going with her mother as a result of her parents divorcing. As situations in their road trip go from gray and stormy to bright and sunny, the girl rolls down her window and smiles in the end of the video. The Lumineers themselves make a brief appearance as street performers.

Charts

Weekly charts

Year-end charts

Certifications

References

2011 songs
2012 singles
Dualtone Records singles
The Lumineers songs